Matalon is a surname. Notable people with the surname include:
Eli Matalon (1924–1999), Jamaican businessman and politician
Martín Matalon, Argentinian composer and musician
Moshe Matalon (politician), Israeli politician and member of the Knesset for Yisrael Beiteinu
Moshe Matalon (engineer)
Ronit Matalon (1959–2017), Israeli fiction writer
Salomon Matalon, scout leader in Senegal
Vivian Matalon, British theatre director

See also 

 Amit, Pollak, Matalon & Co., a law firm in Israel

Surnames